Salvadoran Democracy (abbreviated DS) is a Salvadoran political party.

History 

Salvadoran Democracy was registered with the Supreme Electoral Court (TSE) on 13 September 2013, making it eligible to participate in the 2014 presidential election. Its founding leader was Adolfo Salume Artiñano

References

External links 

 Official website

Political parties in El Salvador
Political parties established in 2013
2013 establishments in El Salvador